As one of the many migrant groups in Australia, the Serbian diaspora has contributed to the development of soccer in Australia by the formation of numerous organised football clubs across most states and territories in Australia providing a pathway for all Australians to compete.

The oldest of these clubs are White City Beograd Woodville and Fitzroy City Serbia founded in 1952 and 1953 respectively. These Serbian-backed clubs have participated and won at the highest levels of State League play as well as participating in the Karadjordje Cup which has been held every year since 1988.

This is a list of Serbian soccer (football) clubs in Australia:

ACT
 Canberra White Eagles

New South Wales
 Bonnyrigg White Eagles
 Bonnyrigg Football Club
 Albion Park White Eagles
 White City Football Club
 Liverpool Sports Club
 FC Eagles Sydney

South Australia
 White City Beograd

Western Australia
 Dianella White Eagles
 Maddington Eagles

Victoria
 Casey Kings Krajina
 Fitzroy City Serbia
 Noble Park Drina
 Springvale White Eagles
 Westgate Sindjelic

QLD
 United Eagles
 Saint George Willawong FC

See also

Draza Mihajlovic Cup
Karadjordje Cup
List of sports clubs inspired by others
List of Croatian soccer clubs in Australia
List of Greek Soccer clubs in Australia
List of Italian Soccer clubs in Australia

References

External links

Serbian-Australian culture
Serbia
Australia

 
Serbian
Serbian Soccer clubs